James Irvine RDI (1958 – 18 February 2013) was a British industrial designer who created furniture and product designs for many well know companies and brands such as Artemide, B&B Italia, Cappellini, Foscarini, Ikea, Magis, Muji, Thonet, and WMF. He once described the product designer's job as “the work of an unknown hero.”

Irvine was the son of the architect and designer Alan Irvine and his first wife, Betty. He obtained his bachelor's degree in industrial design from the Kingston Polytechnic (now University) alongside fellow designers Jasper Morrison and Michael Young. He subsequently earned a master's degree from the Royal College of Art, and then moved to Milan in 1984 to work with Olivetti. He also worked for one year at the Toshiba Design Center in Tokyo. In 1988 he opened a design studio in Milan, initially collaborating with Cappellini and SCP. He also worked with Ettore Sottsass and became a partner at Sottsass Associati. In 1999 he designed the Mercedes-Benz O530 Citaro bus for the city of Hannover and proposed an accompanying design for the city's bus shelters in preparation for Expo 2000. 

He was a professor of industrial design at the Karlsruhe University of Arts and Design.

In 2004 he was appointed Royal Designer for Industry (RDI).

In 2006 his A 660 Bentwood chair for Thonet received the iF Design Award

In 2007 he was awarded an Honorary Doctorate in Design form Kingston University.

In 2010 his S 123 H barstool for Thonet received the iF Design Award

In 2013 Irvine's "Juno" chair for Arper received both the Design Guild Mark Award and the iF Design Award.

In 2015 Phaidon Press published a monograph about his work and life, with contributions from many of his collaborators and contemporaries including: designers Michele De Lucchi, George Sowden, Stefano Giovannoni, Thomas Sandell, Jasper Morrison, Konstantin Grcic, Naoto Fukasawa, Alberto Meda and Marc Newson; design impresario Giulio Cappellini; design critics Deyan Sudjic and Francesca Picchi. With the publication of the book, the Triennale Design Museum hosted a tribute to Irvine titled "Stories about James" to celebrate the life and work of the designer.

His eponymous company "Studio James Irvine" continues under the guidance of his wife, the architect and Art Director Marialaura Rossiello Irvine.

Irvine died of pneumonia in 2013 at the age of 54 and is buried at the Maggiore cemetery in Milan. He is survived by his wife, designer MariaLaura Rossiello Irvine and two sons Giacomo and Giorgio.

See also 

 GlassLab at the Corning Museum of Glass

Publications

References

External links

 
 Luminaire "A Tribute to James Irvine"
 Articles about James Irvine in dezeen
 James Irvine: GlassLab, Vitra Design Museum, short film (interview)
 

1958 births
Alumni of Kingston University
Alumni of the Royal College of Art
Royal Designers for Industry
English furniture designers
English industrial designers
English emigrants to Italy
Olivetti people
Industrial design
Designers
2013 deaths